Angela Glover Blackwell is an American attorney, civil rights advocate, and author. In 1999, she founded the research and advocacy nonprofit organization PolicyLink and currently serves as its Founder in Residence after twenty years as president and CEO. Blackwell regularly provides expert commentary in a variety of news media and hosts the podcast Radical Imagination.

Early life and education

Blackwell grew up in racially-segregated St. Louis, Missouri, and then completed a B.A. at Howard University. In 2005, Blackwell discussed her childhood in St. Louis with Yes! magazine, stating, "For African-American families such as my own, community was the scaffolding that allowed us to achieve our visions in a society where we were locked out of the mainstream. By building strong communities, we were able to create our own pathways to personal fulfillment." She later completed her J.D. at the University of California at Berkeley School of Law.

Career
Blackwell was a Managing Attorney at the public-interest law firm Public Advocates from 1977 to 1987, which included work on class action lawsuits and firm strategy development. In 1979, she advocated for a grocery store in Bayview–Hunters Point, San Francisco, and while unsuccessful at the time, Gov. Jerry Brown then formed a commission to address the issue of food deserts.

In 1987, Blackwell founded Urban Strategies Council in Oakland, California, which focuses on the needs of children and families with data-driven public policy advocacy and community organizing. After her work at the Urban Strategies Council, Blackwell was then a senior vice president and oversaw the Domestic and Cultural divisions at the Rockefeller Foundation for three years, where she focused on policy issues related to race and inclusion, and developed programs.

In 1999, Blackwell founded PolicyLink, a research and advocacy nonprofit organization focused on economic and social equity for low-income people and communities of color. PolicyLink is staffed by attorneys and public policy experts in California, Washington, D.C., and New York. In 2018, Blackwell transitioned from her role as president and CEO to Founder in Residence at PolicyLink.

In 2011, Blackwell was appointed to the President's Advisory Council on Faith-Based and Neighborhood Partnerships. In 2014, Blackwell was appointed to the President's Advisory Commission on Educational Excellence for African Americans.

In April 2020, Blackwell was appointed to the California Task Force on Business and Jobs Recovery.

Commentary

Blackwell has regularly appeared as a guest on Moyers & Company as a social justice expert, including in 1995, to discuss rebuilding communities, in 2004, to discuss economic and social equity,  in 2012, to discuss her optimism, and in 2014, to discuss systemic racism. Blackwell has also regularly appeared on C-SPAN networks, beginning in 1994. Blackwell also appeared on NPR in 2007 to discuss a study from the Pew Charitable Trusts on economic mobility, and on PBS NewsHour in 2014 to discuss progress made after fifty years of the war on poverty.

In 2009 and 2010, Blackwell wrote commentary about national health policy for The Washington Post. In 2017, Blackwell wrote "The Curb-Cut Effect" in Stanford Social Innovation Review, about how laws and programs designed for vulnerable groups often benefit everyone, followed by "Civil Society and Authentic Engagement in a Diverse Nation" in 2018. Blackwell further expounded on "the curb-cut effect" in a 2017 opinion article in The New York Times.

As founder in residence at PolicyLink, Blackwell has continued to provide expert commentary on economic and social justice issues, including as the keynote speaker at the 2020 "Racism and the Economy" conference series hosted by the presidents of the Atlanta, Boston, and Minneapolis Federal Reserve Banks. In 2020, Blackwell co-authored opinion articles in The New York Times, The Los Angeles Times, and The Mercury News.

In 2019, Blackwell began her podcast Radical Imagination, which hosts experts for discussions about what Sarah Larson at The New Yorker described as "big ideas, including reparations, housing as a human right, universal basic income, and [...] police abolition."

Honors and awards
 1994 Honorary Degree, Mills College.
 2014 Richman Fellowship in Public Life, Brandeis University.
 2017 Peter E. Haas Public Service Award, University of California, Berkeley.
 nominee, 2017 Visionary of the Year award, San Francisco Chronicle and the School of Economics and Business Administration at St. Mary's College.
 2018 John W. Gardner Leadership Award, Independent Sector.

Works
 Blackwell, A.G., Kwoh, S., Pastor, M. Uncommon Common Ground: Race and America’s Future, New York: W. W. Norton & Company, 2010. . 
 Edited by Edwards, J., Crain, M., Kalleberg, A.L. Ending Poverty in America:  How to Restore the American Dream, New York: The New Press, 2007. .
 Smiley, Tavis (ed.). The Covenant with Black America, 2006
 Duncan, C.M., with a foreword by Angela Blackwell. Worlds Apart: Poverty and Politics in Rural America New Haven, CT: Yale University Press, 2014. .
 What It’s Worth: Strengthening the Financial Future of Families, Communities and the Nation (Federal Reserve Bank of San Francisco and CFED, 2015) (contribution)

Personal life
Blackwell is married to Dr. Fred Blackwell, an orthopedic surgeon, has two children, and several grandchildren. She has lived in Oakland, California for more than four decades.

References

External links 
 Urban Strategies Council
 PolicyLink

Living people
1940s births
American civil rights activists
Women civil rights activists
African-American activists
People from St. Louis County, Missouri
Businesspeople from Oakland, California
American lawyers
American women lawyers
African-American lawyers
African-American women lawyers
21st-century American writers
21st-century American women writers
African-American women in politics
20th-century African-American women
20th-century African-American people
21st-century African-American women writers
21st-century African-American writers